Hajji Kola (also Romanized as Ḩājjī Kolā; also known as Ḩājjī Kolā-ye Bālā) is a village in Gatab-e Shomali Rural District, Gatab District, Babol County, Mazandaran Province, Iran. At the 2006 census, its population was 1,128, in 291 families.

References 

Populated places in Babol County